Kenneth Foster (born 16 June 1951) is a British ice dancer. He competed in the ice dance event at the 1976 Winter Olympics.

References

External links
 

1951 births
Living people
British male ice dancers
Olympic figure skaters of Great Britain
Figure skaters at the 1976 Winter Olympics
Place of birth missing (living people)